Baba Behbud or Baba bey Behbud Saricali Javanshir (b. 1897, Shusha, Russian Empire - d. Istanbul, Türkiye, 1970) was an officer in the National Army of Azerbaijan People's Republic. He also served as an immigrant colonel of Turkish Armed Forces in the Turkish Independence War. He was awarded the Medal of Independence.

Early life 
Baba bey was born in Shusha in 1897. He belonged to the Behbudov noble family from the Karabakh region of Azerbaijan. The family was founded by Behbud Ali bey, the brother of Panah Ali Khan, who was the founder of the Karabakh Khanate. Baba bey's parents were  Mustafa bey and Mina khanum. He had two sisters, Afer and Aghca.

Career 
He served in the army of land forces of the Azerbaijan People's Republic. After the occupation of Azerbaijan by the Soviet army on April 28, 1920, revolts began in Ganja and Karabakh. The rebellion in Ganja was commanded by members of the Azerbaijani Army, while the rebellion in Karabakh was commanded by Nuri Pasha. Baba bey joined the rebellion together with the Karabakh cavalry that he commanded. 

After the rebellion was suppressed, he moved to Iran with the survivors of this group. He moved to Turkey, where he joined the resistance in Anatolia and fought in the War of Independence. He was awarded the Medal of Independence by Mustafa Kemal for his services. After the war, he suppressed ethnic and religious rebellions between 1925 and 1927. He was promoted to Captain in 1933, Major in 1940, Lieutenant Colonel in 1944, and Colonel in 1948. He then commanded the cavalry division in Ankara. He retired from the army in 1955. During his life in Turkey, he was an active member of the Azerbaijani emigration in Turkey and had many meetings with Mahammad Amin Rasulzade.

He died on 10 July 1970 in Istanbul and was buried in Feriköy Cemetery.

See also 
 Nuri Berköz
 Samad bey Rafibeyli

References

Source 
 

1897 births
1970 deaths
20th century in Azerbaijan
People from the Russian Empire
Ethnic Afshar people
Burials at Feriköy Cemetery
Turkish military personnel
Colonels (military rank)
Turkish people of Azerbaijani descent
Azerbaijani military personnel
Recipients of the Medal of Independence with Red Ribbon (Turkey)
Military personnel from Shusha